Mundŏk County is a kun (county) in South P'yŏngan province, North Korea.

Administrative divisions
Mundŏk County is divided into 1 ŭp (town), 1 rodongjagu (workers' districts) and 21 ri (villages):

Transportation
Mundŏk county is served by the P'yŏngŭi and Sŏhae lines of the Korean State Railway.

References

External links
  Map of Pyongan provinces
  Detailed map
 http://www.dailynk.com/english/read.php?cataId=nk02900&num=14584

Counties of South Pyongan